Rodney Kenneth Drury (born 1966) is a New Zealand technology entrepreneur, predominately known for his association with accounting software company, Xero. Drury was CEO of Xero until 2018, after founding the company in 2006.

Drury made his initial fortune through Glazier Systems, a New Zealand software development and consulting company, which was sold in 1999. He subsequently established Context Connect and an email technology company called Aftermail. He is a former director of Trade Me, and was involved in the now-defunct Pacific Fibre project.

Early life 
Drury is the son of a tradesman and an executive assistant and grew up in Hawke's Bay. He is reported to have Māori heritage, with his father tracing a lineage to Ngāi Tahu.

Drury attended Napier Boys' High School, which is where he says he developed an interest in computer programming, before going on to study commerce and administration at Victoria University of Wellington. After university, he worked at the accounting firm Arthur Young, which became Ernst & Young in 1989.

In his early 20s, Drury stuttered so badly that he struggled to speak on the phone. However, he was able to overcome it using a smooth speech course at about age 27. He says that overcoming his stutter was crucial to starting the Xero business.

Career 
In 1995, Drury established Glazier Systems, a New Zealand software development and consulting company. Glazier Systems was acquired by Advantage Group in 1999 for approximately $7.5 million, which later became Intergen. Drury subsequently co-founded Context Connect and then founded and served as CEO of AfterMail which was acquired by Quest Software (subsequently acquired by Francisco Partners and Elliott Management Corporation).

In July 2006 Drury founded Xero, a publicly listed software as a service accounting-software company, and served as its CEO.

In October 2007, Drury was a judge for the New Zealand Open Source Awards.

Drury co-founded Pacific Fibre, a company which attempted to build an internet cable between Australia, New Zealand, and the United States. The cable would have cost around $400 million but the venture was ultimately unsuccessful.

In November 2017, he sold $95 million worth of shares in Xero, leaving him with a 13 per cent holding in the company. He stated the sale would support his "future plans to pursue a range of philanthropic and social endeavours." He stepped down as CEO of Xero in March 2018, continuing on with the company as a non-executive director.

Awards
Drury was awarded the Hi-Tech New Zealand "Entrepreneur of the Year" award in 2006 and 2007.

In August 2008 Drury was conferred the title of Honorary Fellow of the New Zealand Computer Society (HFNZCS) during the 2008 NZ Computerworld Excellence Awards. He is only the 21st person to be awarded the title in the Society's 48-year history.

In 2012, Drury was awarded NZ Herald Business Leader of the Year.

In 2013, Drury was named Ernst and Young Entrepreneur of the Year.

Personal life
Drury has three children from his first marriage. He lives in Havelock North, Hawke's Bay region. Drury has also said that he enjoys surfing, skateboarding and mountain biking in his free time.

In 2020, Drury donated $1,000,000 to the iwi charity Mana Tahuna to clean up Queenstown’s Lake Hayes.

In 2022, Drury donated $100,000 to Act.

References

External links 

Interview with Drury, Social Media NZ

New Zealand businesspeople
Living people
1966 births
Ngāi Tahu people
People educated at Napier Boys' High School